Alexander Mies (born 25 June 1992) is a German racing driver currently competing in the TCR International Series, TCR Thailand Touring Car Championship and the VLN. Having previously competed in the BMW M235i Racing Cup Belgium and German Slalom Championship amongst others.

Racing career
Mies began his career in 2000 in Karting, he raced there until 2007. Switching to the German Slalom Championship in 2009, finishing second in the Junior standings that year. In 2010 his switched to the German Veranstaltergemeinschaft Langstreckenpokal Nürburgring series, he has won the SP3 class twice at the 24 Hours of Nürburgring in 2011 and 2013, also winning the VLN Junior Trophy in 2013. He also raced in the Belgium BMW M235i Racing Cup in 2015, finishing 8th in the championship standings. For 2016 he switched to the all new 2016 TCR Thailand Touring Car Championship.

In August 2016 it was announced that he would race in the TCR International Series, driving a SEAT León Cup Racer for Kratingdaeng Racing Team.

Racing record

Complete TCR International Series results
(key) (Races in bold indicate pole position) (Races in italics indicate fastest lap)

References

External links 

 
 

1992 births
Living people
TCR International Series drivers
German racing drivers
People from Velbert
Sportspeople from Düsseldorf (region)
Racing drivers from North Rhine-Westphalia
Phoenix Racing drivers
Nürburgring 24 Hours drivers
GT4 European Series drivers